is a Japanese word processor produced by JustSystems, a Japanese software company. Ichitaro occupies the second share in Japanese word-processing software, behind Microsoft Word. It is one of the main products of the company. Its proprietary file extension is ".JTD". ATOK, an IME developed by JustSystems, is bundled with Ichitaro.

In the DOS era, Ichitaro had a considerable market share along with other rivals. However, as Windows became dominant, the market was largely taken over by Microsoft Word.

Origin of name 
When he worked part-time as a tutor, one of his learners' names was Taro. He died of sickness when Kazunori worked at the company. Taro is also a common Japanese given name used for the eldest son. Sanyo Electric already had a trademark right of the name, so JustSystems added a prefix "" as they hoped the software won the best.

History

Beginnings 
Kazunori worked at a subsidiary company of Toshiba, and he was interested in Japanese-language computing. Toshiba released  in February 1979, the first word processor for the Japanese language, but it sold less than their business computers. He founded the company as a dealer of business computers, and they started selling Japanese language software. After the release of PC-8801, they developed an invoicing software for it, which printed out estimations and invoices in Japanese. They demonstrated it at trade fairs, and received a positive response.

When they contacted to ASCII Microsoft about a run-time license fee of the BASIC compiler used for their farm management software, ASCII had known JustSystem's Japanese software, so they asked JustSystems to develop a Japanese word processor software for PC-100. It was released as JS-WORD in 1983. It was followed by JS-WORD 2.0 ported for PC-9801. Both were published by ASCII under their name. JS-WORD featured mouse support and a graphical icon-based interface, but it resulted in poor performance. The jX-WORD for the IBM JX was released and in 1985, jX-WORD Taro was released for PC-9801. jX-WORD Taro was priced at 58,000 yen, which was the middle price among Japanese word processor software, and sold 9,700 copies.

Domination in Japan PC market 

 
The same year, Ichitaro was released as its definite successor. Ichitaro's system disk contained ATOK 4 and a runtime version of MS-DOS 2.11. It allowed users to use other MS-DOS applications with Japanese language support. It gained speed from being written in assembly language and natively ran on PC-9801, but Matsu's Japanese input method couldn't be used for other applications. Ichitaro had plenty of typesettings options, but Matsu did not. Also, Matsu was priced at 128,000 yen before Ichitaro came out.

The first version of Ichitaro has shipped 29,000 copies. Ichitaro Ver.2 has shipped 80,000 copies. Ichitaro Ver.3 was the first version ported for other Japanese DOS platforms. It has shipped more than 300,000 copies until 1991. Total shipments of Ichitaro reached one million in November 1991. Contrary to the Japanese personal computer market expanding into beginners, Matsu oriented for power users, so Ichitaro overtook it.

Ichitaro Ver.4 was released in April 1989. It had a proprietary operating environment called , like Lotus Symphony. Three minor versions were released because it was buggy. The stable version was 4.3 released in December 1989. ATOK 7 was bundled with Ichitaro 4, and was available as a standalone product in 1992.

Arrival of Microsoft Word 
Microsoft released the first Japanese version of Microsoft Word for Windows in 1991. Four years passed before Ichitaro 5 was released for Japanese DOS platforms in April 1993. The next month, Microsoft released the Japanese Windows 3.1 and the first Japanese version of Microsoft Office, which included Word 5.0 and Excel 4.0. Its successors shipped 200,000 copies per month in late 1994. JustSystems barely completed a Windows adaptation of Ichitaro in December 1993, but Microsoft took over the market dominated by Ichitaro and Lotus 1-2-3.

As of 1997, a Japanese media website reported that 64 percent of readers using Microsoft Word, and the main reason was that they used it in offices and schools. The rest of 35 percent were using Ichitaro, and the main reason was that the IME of ATOK was convenience.

In 1998, the Japan Fair Trade Commission informed Microsoft of an unfair trade that they forced personal computer manufacturers to bundle with Excel and Word against the request of a bundle with Excel and Ichitaro.

Ichitaro Ver.5 was ported to the Macintosh and to OS/2. In May 2003, the release of a Linux version was announced. Compact versions, "Ichitaro dash" and "Ichitaro lite" are produced for laptop PCs. As office suite, "Just home" is also available. "Ichitaro smile" is targeted at elementary school students and "Ichitaro jump" at middle and high school students.

On 1 February 2005, sales and production of the software were frozen pending an appeal by the company against a ruling of the Tokyo District Court which states that there is a breach of a patent owned by Matsushita Electric Industrial Co., Ltd. However, on 30 September 2005, Intellectual Property High Court of Japan, which was newly formed in April 2005, has granted JustSystems’ appeal. Because this judgement became a final decision in October 2005, the original decision sentenced by the Tokyo District Court was overturned.

In 2009, JustSystems became a subsidiary company of Keyence. In the 2010s, they focus on correspondence education and enterprise software although Ichitaro and ATOK continue to be developed.

Versions

Security
In 2013, Symantec revealed that Ichitaro had the potential to be targeted by trojan horse programs. A gang of Chinese hackers was widely blamed for the incident.

See also
ATOK
Office Open XML software
OpenDocument software

Further reading
2005 (Ne) 10040 Appeal Case of Seeking Injunction against Patent Infringement - the Intellectual Property High Court of Japan

References

External links

Windows word processors
Linux word processors
1983 software